Meeting of the minds (also referred to as mutual agreement, mutual assent or consensus ad idem) is a phrase in contract law used to describe the intentions of the parties forming the contract. In particular, it refers to the situation where there is a common understanding in the formation of the contract. Formation of a contract is initiated with a proposal or offer. This condition or element is considered a requirement to the formation of a contract in some jurisdictions.

History 
Richard Austen-Baker has suggested that the perpetuation of the idea of "meeting of minds" may come from a misunderstanding of the Latin term consensus ad idem, which actually means "agreement to the [same] thing". There must be evidence that the parties had each, from an objective perspective, engaged in conduct manifesting their assent, and a contract will be formed when the parties have met such a requirement.

Concept in academic work
German jurist, Friedrich Carl von Savigny is usually credited with developing the will theory of contract in his work System des heutigen Römischen Rechts (1840).

Sir Frederick Pollock is one person known for expounding the idea of a contract based on a meeting of minds, at which time it gained much support in the courts.

Oliver Wendell Holmes wrote in 1897 that a meeting of minds was really a fiction.

The English contracts scholar Richard Austen-Baker has suggested that the perpetuation of the concept into current times is based on a confusion of it with the concept of a consensus ad idem ("agreement to the same [thing]") which is an undoubted requirement of synallagmatic contracting, and that this confusion may be the result of recent ignorance of Latin.

Use in case law
In Household Fire and Carriage Accident Insurance Co Ltd v Grant (1879) 4 Ex D 216, Thesiger LJ said, in the course of a judgment on the postal rule,

In Carlill v Carbolic Smoke Ball Company [1893] 1 QB 256, Bowen LJ said,

In Balfour v Balfour [1919] 2 KB 571, Atkin LJ said,

In Baltimore & Ohio R. Co. v. United States (1923) the US Supreme Court said an implied in fact contract is,

The reasoning is that a party should not be held to a contract that they were not even aware existed. A mutual promise between friends over simple personal matters should not be a situation where legal remedies are to be used.  Equally, any such agreement where the obligation is primarily a moral one rather than a legal one should not be enforceable. It is only when all parties involved are aware of the formation of a legal obligation is there a meeting of the minds.

However, the awareness of a legal obligation is established, not through each party's subjective understanding of the terms, but on "objective indicators," based on what each party said and did.

Under the formalist theory of contract, every contract must have six elements: offer, acceptance, consideration, meeting of the minds, capacity and legality.  Many other contracts, but not all types of contracts, also must be in writing and be signed by the responsible party, in an element called form.

Vices of consent
Mutual assent is vitiated by actions such as fraud, undue influence, duress (see per minas), mutual mistake, or misrepresentation. This may render a contract void or unenforceable.

See also
Contract
Offer and acceptance
Agreement in English law
Raffles v Wichelhaus

Notes

References
Sir F. Pollock, The Principles of Contract (1876)

Contract law
Legal doctrines and principles